Sitgreaves is a surname. Notable people with the surname include:

Beverley Sitgreaves (1867–1943), American actress
John Sitgreaves (1757–1802), American politician and judge
Lorenzo Sitgreaves, the leader of the Sitgreaves Expedition and namesake of Sitgreaves Pass 
Rosedith Sitgreaves (1915–1992), American statistician
Samuel Sitgreaves (1764–1827), US Representative from Pennsylvania

See also
Apache-Sitgreaves National Forest in Arizona and New Mexico
Sitgreaves Expedition, an exploration of three rivers in the US Southwest in 1851
Sitgreaves House, a historic home in South Carolina, built in 1907.
Sitgreaves Pass in the Black Mountains of Arizona